The O'Neill United States Post Office was built in the 1930s.  It is a one-story Georgian Revival style building built from standard plans. It was listed on the National Register of Historic Places in 1992.

It is one of 12 Nebraska post offices featuring a Section of Fine Arts mural.  Its mural is "Baling Hay in Holt County in the Early Days" by Eugene Trentham, completed in May, 1938.

References

Post office buildings on the National Register of Historic Places in Nebraska
Georgian Revival architecture in Nebraska
Government buildings completed in 1938
Buildings and structures in Holt County, Nebraska
Post office buildings in Nebraska